Fitz Albert Cotterell (born ), better known as Prezident Brown, is a Jamaican reggae/dancehall vocalist

Biography
Fitz Albert Cotterell was born in Johnny's Hill district on the Bullhead Mountain, Jamaica in the mid-1960s and raised in Oracabessa, St. Mary. He built up a reputation by performing on local sound systems throughout the 1980s, under various names including Junior Ranking, before starting his recording career in the late 1980s. He was given the name Prezident Brown by producer and sound system operator Jack Ruby, who made him the resident deejay on his Hi-Power sound system. Early singles included "Tears" and "Everything is Right" (with Jack Radics) and (Professor Frisky)and all time Jamaican favourite song "Mickey Mouse" on the DigitalB label. His lyrics concentrate on "cultural" themes. He broke through to a wider audience with performances in 1995 at the Reggae Sumfest and Reggae Sunsplash festivals. He recorded the anti-drugs song "Blow Your Nose" with Everton Blender, and "Wrong or Right", which received international daytime radio play. He was also featured on "Black and Proud" on the Steel Pulse album Rage and Fury. He collaborated with Anthony Red Rose and Anthony Malvo on "Red Alert", which topped the Jamaican singles chart, and his continuing success saw him sign to Chris Blackwell's Island Jamaica label, although an album recorded for the label was never released.

He toured the United States in 2002, playing 46 shows including an appearance at the Sierra Nevada World Music Festival, and toured the US again in 2009.

In 2012 he released the album I Sound Is From Creation and again toured the US, in 2013 Prezident Brown will tour Europe

Discography
Big Bad and Talented (1995), X Rated/Runn Records
Original Blue Print (1996), Digital B
Prezident Selection (1996), Runn Records
To Jah Only (Praying for the World) (1999), Kariang
Showcase Volume One, Jahmani
Showcase Volume Two, Jahmani
Showcase Volume Three-Prepare Ye the Way, (2003) Jahmani
Generation Next (2003)Chet/Sony
Showcase Volume Four-Health And Strength (2007), Muzik Ave.
Common Prosperity (2009), Tomorrow's Children
I Sound Is From Creation (2012), Tad's
The Journeyman Ep (2015), Tower Production

References

External links
Interview at jahworks.org

Jamaican reggae singers
1960s births
Living people
People from Clarendon Parish, Jamaica